Kaiava Salusalu, written also as Kaiyava Salusalu (born Ba, 8 May 1957) is a Fijian former rugby union and rugby league footballer who played as a centre. 

He is father of Semisi Tora, who plays for Nyanga Tigers and Fiji Bati.

Career

Rugby union career
His first international cap for Fiji was in the match against Tonga, at Suva, on 28 August 1982. He was also part of the 1987 Rugby World Cup, where he played two matches in the tournament. Salusalu also played for the South Pacific Barbarians, on a rebel tour in South Africa.
His last international cap was during the match against Samoa, at Nausori, on 23 June 1990.

Rugby league career
Later, he played in 1992 the first match of the Fiji Bati and switched code to rugby league. Salusalu was part of the 1995 Rugby League World Cup Fiji squad. In 1996, Salusalu, who captained the Fiji Bati against Australia during the Super League war. as well in the matches where Fiji beat Tonga, Samoa and Papua New Guinea, where also played Kalaveti Naisoro, Mesake Navugona, Vula Dakuitoga, Jioji Vatubua, Nimilote Ratudina and Savenaca Taga. As of 2017, Salusalu coaches Yasawa, a rugby league team from his home village.

References

External links
Kaiava Salusalu international rugby union statistics at ESPN Scrum
Kaiyava Salusalu international rugby league statistics at RugbyLeagueProject

1957 births
Living people
Fiji international rugby union players
Fiji national rugby league team captains
Fiji national rugby league team players
Fijian rugby league players
Fijian rugby union players
I-Taukei Fijian people
People from Ba Province
Rugby league props
Rugby union centres